The Kaghan Valley is an alpine valley located in the Mansehra District of Khyber Pakhtunkhwa, Pakistan. Landslides triggered by the devastating 2005 Kashmir earthquake destroyed many passes leading into the valley, though roads have since been largely rebuilt. The Kaghan is a highly popular tourist attraction.

Geography 
The Kaghan Valley is located in Khyber Pakhtunkhwa, Pakistan (formerly known as the North-West Frontier Province), and borders the Pakistani-administered territories of Gilgit-Baltistan and Azad Jammu and Kashmir to the north and east, respectively. The 155-kilometre-long valley is enveloped by the Lower Himalayan mountain range, resulting in an alpine climate and the prevalence of pine forests and alpine meadows. Alongside the flow of the Kunhar River, the valley features glaciers, crystal-like clear lakes, waterfalls and frosty mountain streams. The Kaghan is famous for its scenic beauty and landscapes, resulting in its popularity as a summertime resort amongst locals and tourists alike.

Access 
The Kaghan Valley can be reached by road via  Balakot through Mansehra and Abbottabad. In Balakot, public buses and other vehicular transport can be used to travel to the valley. Additionally, the Kaghan Valley can also be reached from Peshawar or the national capital of Islamabad by renting a car to Abbottabad or Mansehra; tourists can then order a taxi or other available methods of public transport to go to the valley.

The valley is always accessible during the summer and closed to visitors during winter. This is because glaciers block the roads leading to the Kaghan during winter, although these glaciers typically melt between February and April. From May to the end of September, the roads and Babusar Pass remain open.

See also 

Kumrat Valley
Naltar Valley
Neelum District
Swat District

References

Mansehra District
Hill stations in Pakistan
Valleys of Khyber Pakhtunkhwa
Tourist attractions in Khyber Pakhtunkhwa